Hydropionea schausalis is a moth in the family Crambidae. It was described by Harrison Gray Dyar Jr. in 1923. It is found in Guatemala.

References

Moths described in 1923
Spilomelinae